Manhattan Blues is an album by saxophonist Ricky Ford.

Recording and music
Manhattan Blues was recorded on March 4, 1989, in New York City. It is a quartet recording, with leader Ricky Ford (tenor sax) joined by Jaki Byard (piano), Milt Hinton (bass), and Ben Riley (drums). Six of the nine tracks are Ford originals. The album was released on CD by Candid Records.

Reception
The Los Angeles Times reviewer commented that Ford combined "modern and traditional values into a very appealing style". For AllMusic, Scott Yanow summarised it as "Stimulating music".

Track listing
"In Walked Bud" (Thelonious Monk)
"Misty" (Erroll Garner, Johnny Burke)
"Ode to Crispus Attucks" (Ricky Ford)
"Portrait of Mingus" (Ford)
"Bop Nouveau" (Ford)
"My Little Strayhorn" (Ford)
"Manhattan Blues" (Ford)
"Land Preserved" (Ford)
"Half Nelson" (Miles Davis)

Personnel
Ricky Ford – tenor sax
Jaki Byard – piano
Milt Hinton – bass
Ben Riley – drums

References

1989 albums
Candid Records albums
Ricky Ford albums